Earl of Dublin is a title that has been created three times in British and Irish history.

It was created first on 22 October 1766 in the Peerage of Ireland for Prince Henry, Duke of Cumberland and Strathearn, younger brother of King George III.  This title became extinct in 1790 upon the Duke's dying childless.  It was created again on 24 April 1799, again in the Peerage of Ireland, for Prince Edward, Duke of Kent and Strathearn, fourth son of George III.  This title became extinct upon his death without sons, in 1820.  It was created a third time on 10 September 1849 (or according to some sources, 17 January 1850) in the Peerage of the United Kingdom for Albert Edward, Prince of Wales, eldest son of Queen Victoria.

Earls of Dublin, first creation (1766)
Prince Henry, 1st Earl of Dublin, Duke of Cumberland (1745–1790) (extinct)

Earls of Dublin, second creation (1799)
Prince Edward, 1st Earl of Dublin, Duke of Kent and Strathearn (1767–1820) (extinct)

Earls of Dublin, third creation (1849/50)
Prince Albert Edward, 1st Earl of Dublin, Prince of Wales (1849/50–1910) (merged with the Crown in 1901)

See also
Marquess of Dublin
Kings of Dublin

References

 
Extinct earldoms in the Peerage of Ireland
Extinct earldoms in the Peerage of the United Kingdom
British and Irish peerages which merged in the Crown
Noble titles created in 1766
Noble titles created in 1799
Noble titles created in 1850